Dr. Basil Ivanhoe Gooden  is an American governmental executive whose career has advanced equitable food systems, agriculture policy, public health, and community economic development in rural America. Dr. Gooden served as the 3rd Virginia Secretary of Agriculture and Forestry for the Commonwealth of Virginia in the cabinet of Governor Terry McAuliffe. He became the first Black American to serve in this position and during his tenure from September 2016 until January 2018, he was the only Black American Secretary of Agriculture in any state in the United States. In his capacity as Secretary, he provided strategic vision and leadership to two of Virginia's largest private industries, Agriculture and Forestry, with an annual economic impact of $91 billion on the Commonwealth.

Prior to serving as Secretary, Dr. Gooden was appointed by then President Barack Obama to serve as the state director for USDA – Rural Development in Virginia.  In that position, he served as the chief executive officer of this federal agency that allocated approximately $1.25 billion annually to improve the economy and quality of life in rural Virginians.

Dr. Gooden served for twelve years as the Chief Deputy Director of the Virginia Department of Housing and Community Development (DHCD) in the administrations of four Virginia governors. He was initially appointed to this position by Governor Mark R. Warner and subsequently re-appointed and served in the administrations of Governors Timothy M. Kaine (D), Robert F. McDonnell (R), and Terry McAuliffe (D).

In 2017, Gooden was elected as a fellow of the National Academy of Public Administration.

Early and personal life 
Dr. Gooden was born in Charlottesville, Virginia to Allen Cortez Gooden, Jr. ( originally of Birmingham, Alabama) and Christine Shelton Gooden (of Buckingham County, Virginia). His parents were long-time educators in Buckingham County where his father was a school principal and his mother was a home economics teacher. He is the sixth of seven children born to Allen and Christine Gooden. Dr. Gooden grew up in Buckingham County, Virginia where he and his family currently own and operate a cattle farm, raising Black Angus beef.  His family farm also participates in tree farming and land conservation efforts. As a youth, he was extremely involved in athletics and many Virginia Cooperative Extension related activities that focused on crop production, livestock, and 4-H activities.

Dr. Gooden graduated from Buckingham County High School and attended Virginia Tech where he received a B.A. in Political Science.  He earned a Master of Social Work degree from Syracuse University in 1995. Additionally, he is a graduate of the University of North Carolina at Chapel Hill where he received a Master of Public Health and a Ph.D. in 1998. Gooden became a member of Alpha Phi Alpha fraternity in 1984 at Virginia Tech.

Dr. Gooden married the former Susan Michelle Tinsley (originally from Bassett/Martinsville, Virginia) on June 12, 1993 in Pittsylvania County, Virginia.  Dr. Susan T. Gooden is currently the Dean and Professor of the L. Douglas Wilder School of Government and Public Affairs at Virginia Commonwealth University. Drs. Basil and Susan Gooden have one daughter, Caper, who received a B.A. from the College of William and Mary and an M.A. in international economics from the School of Advanced International Studies at Johns Hopkins University.

Governmental and economic development work

Secretary of Agriculture and Forestry 
As Virginia's 3rd Secretary of Agriculture and Forestry, Dr. Gooden's top priorities were: (a) increasing economic opportunities in agriculture and forestry; and (b) advancing strategies for rural economic development. These strategies sought to increase the business capacity of farmers, producers and agribusiness as well as increasing Virginia's agricultural and forestry export opportunities to international markets. Under his leadership, the Secretariat worked to promote the economic viability of industrial hemp in Virginia. Also, the Secretariat partnered with the U.S. Farmers and Ranchers Alliance, Secretariat of Technology and James Madison University to host the first-ever Governor's “Smart Farm” Summit on December 12, 2017.

Dr. Gooden worked to expand international trade as a key component of increasing economic opportunities in the agriculture and forestry industries in Virginia. As Secretary, he traveled with Governor Terry McAuliffe on numerous trade/marketing missions visiting 17 countries and 23 cities abroad. A few of these countries include; Cuba, Japan, China, Ireland, Germany, Denmark, Singapore, India, Switzerland, Canada and Mexico. He has met and worked with each member of VDACS’ global network of trade representatives from Canada, Mexico and Latin America, Europe, the Middle East and North Africa, India, China, Hong Kong and Southeast Asia.

U.S. Department of Agriculture - Rural Development 
In 2014, Dr. Gooden was appointed by then-President Barack Obama to serve as the state director for USDA – Rural Development in Virginia.  In that position, Dr. Gooden served as the chief executive officer of this federal agency that allocated approximately $1.25 billion annually to improve the economy and quality of life in rural Virginians. During his tenure at Rural Development, he restructured the agency's workforce, including hiring twenty-six (26) new employees, to improve program delivery, community outreach, and customer service.  USDA-RD assists in building vibrant, sustainable communities by financing projects essential to improving the quality of life and environment. Through USDA-RD, funding is available for job creation, business development, essential community facilities, basic infrastructure and affordable housing. During his tenure as state director, USDA-RD invested more than $2.5 billion into housing, community and economic development projects throughout rural Virginia.

Virginia Department of Housing and Community Development 
Previously, Dr. Gooden served as the Chief Deputy Director of the Virginia Department of Housing and Community Development (DHCD) for twelve years. In that position, his primary administrative responsibilities included strategic management, technology advancement, and community development initiatives in economically distressed communities. Before DHCD, he worked at Virginia Tech where he served as the Coordinator of Outreach and Community Relations.  Additionally, he worked with Virginia Cooperative Extension as an Extension Specialist where he designed and implemented a statewide research project to assess community issues impacting localities across Virginia. Some of his additional professional experiences include working as a Legislative Assistant to former Congressman L.F. Payne, Jr. (Fifth Congressional District of Virginia) and as a Legislative Aide to former United States Senator Charles S. Robb.

References

External links
 Virginia Secretary of Agriculture and Forestry

Living people
1964 births
State cabinet secretaries of Virginia
African-American people in Virginia politics
Syracuse University alumni
UNC Gillings School of Global Public Health alumni
Virginia Tech alumni
Politicians from Charlottesville, Virginia
People from Henrico County, Virginia
People from Buckingham County, Virginia
African-American state cabinet secretaries
21st-century African-American people
20th-century African-American people